Lasse Mikkelsen (born 19 May 1988) is a Danish handball player for Skjern Håndbold and the Danish national team.

References 

Danish male handball players
1988 births
Living people